Juan José Lucas Giménez (born 10 May 1944) is a Spanish attorney, professor and politician in the People's Party.

Early life and education
Giménez was born in Burgo de Osma, Soria, Spain, on 10 May 1944. He graduated from the Universidad Complutense de Madrid with a degree in law.

Professional career
Giménez worked as a professor in 1968 and 1969 and was also a tutor in Soria University. He joined INEM as a technician, and later held positions as secretary, Provincial Director, and Deputy Director General. He left the agency in 1982 to begin work in the Instituto Nacional de Colonización's sociologist group. He was Deputy Director General of Cooperatives in the Ministry of Labor and Social Affairs.

Senate of Spain career
The Cortes of Castile and León appointed Giménez as a Senator on 22 March 2002. He later held the Presidency of the Senate of Spain, between 16 October 2002 and 2 April 2004, before his party lost its absolute majority in both houses in the general elections of 2004. Between 2004 and 2011 he was Second Vice President of the Senate. On 12 December 2011, Mariano Rajoy proposed Giménez to his party as Deputy President of the Senate of Spain for the 10th Legislature.

References

1944 births
Complutense University of Madrid alumni
Living people
Government ministers of Castile and León
Members of the 3rd Congress of Deputies (Spain)
Members of the 4th Congress of Deputies (Spain)
Members of the 3rd Cortes of Castile and León
Members of the 4th Cortes of Castile and León
Members of the 5th Cortes of Castile and León
Members of the 7th Senate of Spain
Members of the 8th Senate of Spain
Members of the 9th Senate of Spain
Members of the 10th Senate of Spain
Members of the 11th Senate of Spain
Members of the 12th Senate of Spain
Members of the 13th Senate of Spain
People from Soria
People's Party (Spain) politicians
Presidents of the Junta of Castile and León
Presidents of the Senate of Spain